The 2012–13 season of the Bolivian Liga Nacional B, the second category of Bolivian football, was played by 15 teams.

Clubs

Results

Hexagonal Final

Standings

External links
 Liga Nacional B

Liga Nacional B seasons
2012–13 in Bolivian football
Bolivian
Bolivian